"One Shot" is the second and final single released from The Brotherhood debut album, Elementalz It was released in 1996 through Bite It, Virgin and was produced by The Underdog. The song peaked at #35 on the Hot Rap Singles and #28 on the Hot Dance Music/Maxi-Singles Sales.

Single track listing
"One Shot"- 4:14 (LP Version)
"Nothing in Particular"- 5:11 (Instrumental)
"One Shot"- 4:21 (96 Remix)
"Nothing in Particular"- 4:12 (Subjectual Remix)

1996 singles
The Brotherhood (rap group) songs
1996 songs
Virgin Records singles